The 2022 Internazionali di Tennis Città di Verona was a professional tennis tournament played on clay courts. It was the second edition of the tournament which was part of the 2022 ATP Challenger Tour. It took place in Verona, Italy, between 11 and 17 July 2022.

Singles main draw entrants

Seeds

 1 Rankings as of 27 June 2022.

Other entrants
The following players received wildcards into the singles main draw:
  Marco Cecchinato
  Bernard Tomic
  Giulio Zeppieri

The following players received entry into the singles main draw as alternates:
  Sebastian Ofner
  Cedrik-Marcel Stebe
  Andrea Vavassori

The following players received entry from the qualifying draw:
  Mattia Bellucci
  Pedro Boscardin Dias
  Raúl Brancaccio
  Matteo Gigante
  Jérôme Kym
  Francesco Maestrelli

Champions

Singles 

  Francesco Maestrelli def.  Pedro Cachín 3–6, 6–3, 6–0.

Doubles 

  Luis David Martínez /  Andrea Vavassori def.  Juan Ignacio Galarza /  Tomás Lipovšek Puches 7–6(7–4), 3–6, [12–10].

References

Internazionali di Tennis Città di Verona
Internazionali di Tennis Città di Verona
July 2022 sports events in Italy